Raise Your Hands, Dead Man, You're Under Arrest is a 1971 Italian-Spanish western film directed by León Klimovsky, produced by Sergio Bergonzelli, scored by Alessandro Alessandroni, and starring Peter Lee Lawrence as Sando Kid, Helga Liné, Espartaco Santoni, and José Canalejas.

It is about the character Sartana. It was shot in Almería.

Cast

References

External links
 

1971 Western (genre) films
1971 films
Spanish Western (genre) films
Films directed by León Klimovsky
Films produced by Sergio Bergonzelli
Films with screenplays by Sergio Bergonzelli
Films scored by Alessandro Alessandroni
Films shot in Madrid
Films shot in Rome
Films shot in Almería